The IFMA was founded in 1917 with the mission of strengthening Christian Mission agencies by upholding standards of operation, assuring integrity and cooperative resourcing to spread the gospel. The organization is now known as Missio Nexus.

External links
CrossGlobal Link Homepage

Christian missions